List of English football transfers 2007–08 may refer to:

List of English football transfers summer 2007
List of English football transfers winter 2007–08
List of English football transfers summer 2008

Transfers
2007